Editha is a small genus of large, brightly colored sand wasps, restricted to South America. They are specialized predators of butterflies, and after capturing and paralyzing their prey, they strip the wings off before placing the bodies in an underground cell to serve as food for the wasp larva.

References

Crabronidae
Apoidea genera
Hymenoptera of South America